Venturia pyrina is a species of fungus in the family Venturiaceae. A plant pathogen, it causes scab or black spot of pear. It has a widespread distribution in temperate and subtropical regions wherever pears are grown.

References

External links

Fungi described in 1896
Fungal tree pathogens and diseases
Pear tree diseases
Venturiaceae